Sarkun may refer to:
 Sarkun-e Biseytun
 Sarkun-e Olya

See also
 Sarkan (disambiguation)